Berkasovo is a village in Serbia. It is situated in the Šid municipality, in the Srem District, Vojvodina province. The village has a Serb ethnic majority and its population numbering 1,228 people (2002 census).

History
It was first mentioned in the 13th century. In the 15th-16th century, Berkasovo was a possession of Serbian despots.

Historical population

1961: 1,214
1971: 1,213
1981: 1,217
1991: 1,103
2002: 1,228

See also
List of places in Serbia
List of cities, towns and villages in Vojvodina

References

Further reading
Slobodan Ćurčić, Broj stanovnika Vojvodine, Novi Sad, 1996.

External links 

Berkasovo

 

Populated places in Syrmia